Royal River is a 1959 Canadian documentary film directed by Gordon Sparling and Roger Blais for the National Film Board of Canada. 

Produced to commemorate the official opening of the St. Lawrence Seaway, the film documents the tour of Queen Elizabeth II and Prince Philip, Duke of Edinburgh aboard the HMY Britannia. It was compiled almost entirely from newsreel footage, including of the royal couple's meetings with John Diefenbaker, Richard Nixon, Dwight Eisenhower and Nelson Rockefeller.

At the 12th Canadian Film Awards in 1960, Royal River won Best Theatrical Short Film.

References

External links 
 
 Watch Royal River at the National Film Board of Canada

1959 films
Canadian documentary films
National Film Board of Canada documentaries
Best Theatrical Short Film Genie and Canadian Screen Award winners
Canadian black-and-white films
1950s English-language films
1950s Canadian films